Rodrigo Pinto Guedes, the 1st Baron of Rio da Prata (27 July 1762 – 13 June 1845) was a Portuguese-born Brazilian naval officer who served in the admiralties of the Kingdom of Portugal, its successor the United Kingdom of Portugal, Brazil and the Algarves, and finally the Empire of Brazil, for which he acted as commander of all naval operations during the Cisplatine War.

Biography
Guedes was born on July 27, 1762, in Aguiar da Beira, Gradiz, Portugal to Rodrigo Pinto Guedes and Maria da Silveira Pereira. His parents intended him to take on a religious life, and sent him to a monastery; however, he ran away and decided to embark on a maritime career. In September 1781, he was named a Cadet of the Portuguese Navy, and thus began what would prove to be a successful career.

He married Constanza Smissaert Pinto Caldas, daughter of José Pereira Caldas and Constanza Smissaert.

Bibliography
 "A War Betwixt Englishmen Brazil Against Argentina on the River Plate 1825-1830", Brian Vale, I. B. Tauris.

1762 births
1845 deaths
Brazilian admirals
People of the Cisplatine War
Brazilian nobility